Kenneth James Higson (14 March 1934 – 22 September 1988) was a Progressive Conservative party member of the House of Commons of Canada. He was born in London, England and followed a legal career.

He represented the Lincoln electoral district on two occasions, following election victories in the 1972 and 1979 federal elections. He served in the 29th and 31st Canadian Parliaments, but was defeated in other elections (1968, 1974 and 1980).

External links
 

1934 births
1988 deaths
English emigrants to Canada
Members of the House of Commons of Canada from Ontario
Progressive Conservative Party of Canada MPs
20th-century Canadian lawyers